Debbie Fuller (née Matoe) is a New Zealand netball coach and former international netball player. Fuller was a defender in the New Zealand national netball team, the Silver Ferns, from 1993 to 1996, during which time she competed at the 1995 Netball World Championships in Birmingham. Fuller retired from the Silver Ferns after 1996, spending a year in Argentina. She returned for the 1997 provincial season, and the following year captained Canterbury in the inaugural National Bank Cup. Fuller moved to the Capital Shakers in 1999, playing with the Wellington-based side until her retirement in 2002.

After coaching stints in Wellington and the Bay of Plenty, Fuller accepted a position as a defensive coach with ANZ Championship side the Northern Mystics for the 2009 season, under new head coach Te Aroha Keenan. She was promoted to assistant coach of the Auckland-based team the following year. Keenan departed the Mystics after the 2010 season, with Fuller being appointed Mystics head coach for 2011. She continued in the role until 2016, while taking a year off in 2014. In 2018 Fuller was appointed as assistant head coach of the Silver Ferns, under head coach and former teammate Noeline Taurua. During her time as assistant coach, the Silver Ferns have won both the 2018 Fast5 Netball World Series and 2019 Netball World Cup tournaments.

References

New Zealand netball coaches
New Zealand international netball players
New Zealand Māori netball players
Living people
Year of birth missing (living people)
Capital Shakers players
ANZ Championship coaches
1995 World Netball Championships players
Northern Mystics coaches
Canterbury Flames players